Violetta may refer to:

Violetta (given name), a female given name
Violetta (instrument), 16th-century musical instrument similar to a violin, but with only three strings
Violetta (performer) (born circa 1906/07), an American sideshow performer, born Aloisla Wagner
Violetta (singer) (5 April 1995), full name Violetta Zironi, Italian singer-songwriter 
Violetta (TV series), a Disney Channel original TV series
Violetta (season 1)
Violetta (soundtrack), soundtrack album to the eponymous series
Violetta (typeface)
557 Violetta, a main-belt asteroid
La traviata or Violetta, an opera by Giuseppe Verdi

See also
 
 Violeta (disambiguation)
 Violet (colour)
 Violette (disambiguation)
 Violet (disambiguation)
 Viola (disambiguation)
 Viorica, a female given name